The following is the discography of the American soul and R&B band Rose Royce:

Albums

Studio albums

Live albums
Greatest Hits Live in Concert (1993, Tring Int'l PLC)
Live in Hollywood (2003, FYD)

Compilation albums

Singles

References

Discographies of American artists
Pop music group discographies
Rhythm and blues discographies
Soul music discographies